Bimah or Bimmah may refer to:

 Bema or, in Jewish contexts, bimah: an elevated platform, a dais; also "stage" in Modern Hebrew
 Bimah Prefecture in Togo, West Africa
 Bimah, Oman, a village in Al Hamra Province, Ad Dakhiliyah Governorate, Oman 
 Bimmah, Oman, a village in eastern Muscat Governorate near Bimmah Sinkhole, Oman

See also
 Habima Theatre, lit. "The Stage [bima(h)] Theatre"